João Pedro Reis Amaral (born 7 September 1991) is a Portuguese professional footballer who plays for Polish club Lech Poznań as an attacking midfielder or a winger.

Club career

Vitória Setúbal
Born in Vila Nova de Gaia, Porto District, Amaral played lower league and amateur football until the age of 24, working in a wine bottle label factory during this timeframe. On 6 June 2016, he moved straight into the Primeira Liga after signing a three-year contract with Vitória F.C. from F.C. Pedras Rubras.

Amaral made his debut in the Portuguese top division on 21 August 2016, starting and featuring 64 minutes in a 1–1 away draw against S.L. Benfica. He scored his first goal in the competition the following weekend to help the hosts defeat F.C. Arouca 2–0, adding a further four until the end of the season – while providing two assists – to help his team finish 12th.

Benfica and Lech Poznań
On 29 May 2018, Amaral joined Benfica on a three-year contract. Shortly after, on 21 July, he signed a four-year deal with Polish club Lech Poznań. He made his debut for the latter five days later, netting in the last minute of the 1–1 away draw against FC Shakhtyor Soligorsk in the UEFA Europa League second qualifying round.

Amaral returned to his country and its top tier on 2 January 2020, being loaned to F.C. Paços de Ferreira until 30 June. On 26 August, he agreed to a similar move to the same team.

Career statistics

Club

Honours
Lech Poznań
Ekstraklasa: 2021–22

References

External links

Portuguese League profile 

1991 births
Living people
Sportspeople from Vila Nova de Gaia
Portuguese footballers
Association football midfielders
Association football wingers
Primeira Liga players
Segunda Divisão players
CD Candal players
Padroense F.C. players
SC Mirandela players
F.C. Pedras Rubras players
AD Oliveirense players
Vitória F.C. players
S.L. Benfica footballers
F.C. Paços de Ferreira players
Ekstraklasa players
II liga players
Lech Poznań players
Lech Poznań II players
Portuguese expatriate footballers
Expatriate footballers in Poland
Portuguese expatriate sportspeople in Poland